General elections were held in Nepal on 3 and 17 May 1999. The Nepali Congress emerged as the largest party, gaining 28 seats, while the Communist Party of Nepal (Unified Marxist-Leninist) (CPN–UML) lost 17.

Background
The previous elections o the Pratinidhi Sabha in 1994 had seen the CPN–UML emerge victorious and the first-ever popularly elected communist government formed. Yet by 1999, infighting, such as the departure of the Bam Dev Gautam and C.P. Mainali led splinter group, had got in the way of policy decisions and put certain people off voting for the party.

Results

Distribution of seats

Aftermath
Following the elections, the various parties found it difficult to cooperate and finalise a policy of the Maoist rebels, culminating in the 2002 dissolution of the parliament by King Gyanendra.

Following the 2006 Loktantra Andolan, in which all of the parties successful in 1999, except the royalist Rashtriya Prajatantra Party participated in the Seven Party Alliance, the House was reinstated in 2006.

See also
List of MPs elected in the 1999 Nepalese general election
Winners and runner-ups in the legislative elections of Nepal 1994 and 1999

References 

General elections in Nepal
Nepal
1999 elections in Nepal
History of Nepal (1951–2008)
May 1999 events in Asia
Politics of the Nepalese Civil War